Montánchez is a municipality located in the province of Cáceres, Extremadura, Spain.
The municipality has an approximate population of just over 2,000.

The town sits in the Sierra de Montánchez, a small mountain range rising above the plains of Extremadura. Its elevated position has earned it the nickname "the balcony of Extremadura".

The town's economy relies principally on agriculture. It is one of the main centres in Spain for the production of jamón ibérico, and also produces wine.

History

Although there is evidence of prehistoric settlement, the first major residents were the Romans, who founded the town in the 1st century AD. Moorish invaders captured the town in 713, taking advantage of its strategic location in the mountains to build a castle, which still dominates the village today. The town reverted to Christianity in 1230, when it was taken by Alfonso IX. The castle was updated at this time, but continued to form an important defensive line.

References

External links
 History of the town in Spanish - currently incomplete, but with some detailed information on Prehistory
 Rural accommodation in Montanchez / Alcuescar area
 Information about activities in English also rural accommodation in Montanchez area

Municipalities in the Province of Cáceres